The 2019–20 Houston Baptist Huskies women's basketball team represented Houston Baptist University in the 2019–20 college basketball season. The Huskies, led by seventh year head coach Donna Finnie, played their home games at the Sharp Gymnasium and are members of the Southland Conference. They finished the season 8–21, 4–16 in Southland play to finish in a tie for 11th place. They failed to qualify for the Southland women's tournament, but the tournament would later be cancelled due to the coronavirus pandemic.

Previous season
The Huskies finished the season 8–20, 3–15 in Southland play to finish in a tie for last place. They failed to qualify for the Southland women's tournament.

Roster
Sources:

Schedule and results
Sources:

|-
!colspan=9 style=| Non-Conference Schedule

|-
!colspan=9 style=| Southland Conference Schedule

See also
2019–20 Houston Baptist Huskies men's basketball team

References

Houston Christian Huskies women's basketball seasons
Houston Baptist
Houston Baptist Huskies basketball
Houston Baptist Huskies basketball